Sociology of conflict may refer to:

 Conflict theory
 Social conflict
 Social conflict theory
 Sociology of peace, war, and social conflict